Paul John Whisky  is a brand of Indian single malt whisky and single cask whisky, manufactured by John Distilleries. The brand launched in London, England on 4 October 2012. Paul John Whisky is made from Indian 6-row malted barley and, for some variants, imported Islay and Aberdeen peat, distilled in traditional copper pot stills and then matured in charred American Oak casks at the company's distillery in Goa, India.

Paul John Single Malt Whisky was first launched in 2012 in the United Kingdom, then in Goa, India, in 2013, and Bangalore in 2015. It was named after the Founder and Chairman of John Distilleries, Paul P. John.

History
John Distilleries is based in Bangalore, India, and its single malt distillery is located in Goa. The distillery is equipped with two sets of Indian-made copper pot stills (one for wash and one for spirit), with a daily production capacity of 6,000 liters. There is also a visitor centre located on the premises, the distillery being the first in India to allow tours of the facility. Maturation takes place in a climate-controlled underground cellar that has around 10,000 barrels, as well as in on-ground warehouses. The company had been making blended whisky since 1996, and single malt whisky since 2008 in an attempt to enter the premium end of the market. Master Distiller Michael D'Souza chose to use Indian ingredients in the making of the single malts, to give the whisky characteristics of its country of origin. The wash he created had an ABV of 5%, lower than the standard 8% for most whisky. This creates a sweeter flavour in the final product. The whisky is put in the casks at 55% ABV, but the alcoholic strength increases as it ages due to the heat, giving the final product an ABV of 57%.

Goa features a tropical monsoon climate and being in the tropical zone and near the Arabian Sea, has a hot and humid climate for most of the year. The tropical climate of Goa matures the liquid faster than colder climatic regions. The fraction lost to evaporation during ageing, known as the angels' share, is also higher in India, at 8-10% per year, than in Scotland, where the annual evaporation loss is about 2%. This leaves a hogshead with only 150 bottles left in it, after three years, compared to around 350 in Scotland. Michael D'Souza describes it this way, "Whisky matured at these temperatures simply cannot be aged for the kind of time expected with Scotch, even trying to mature our whisky for just 10 years would leave barely a bottle of liquid in the barrel. Fortunately, the heat actually speeds up the maturation process considerably. As a result, whisky that has been matured for just 4-5 years – as is the case with Paul John Edited and Brilliance – is equivalent to a Scotch that has been aged for around 15 years".

The first bottling of Paul John Single Malt, "Paul John Single Cask 161 Whisky," was officially launched in London, England on 4 October 2012 by Sanjay Paul, CEO of Alcobev Communications, at the Capital Hotel in Knightsbridge, London, England.[28] The brand's second release, "Paul John Single Cask 163 Whisky" was also released by Sanjay Paul, CEO of Alcobev Communications, having 57% abv and priced at £60.[29] Following the single cask release, Sanjay Paul, CEO of Alcobev Communications released Paul John's flagship single malt whiskies in May 2013.[30] They were branded Paul John Brilliance, Paul John Edited and Paul John Bold.[31] It was an unpeated single cask whisky, made from Indian malted barley, distilled twice in traditional copper pot stills, and aged for an unspecified period in first-fill charred American casks. It was bottled at cask strength: 57% ABV and 150 bottles were made from the cask. Whisky connoisseur Jim Murray gave it 94.5 points and the "Liquid Gold" award in his Whisky Bible. The brand's second release was "Paul John Single Cask 163 Whisky" having 57% ABV and priced at £60 in 2012. Presently, the flagship expressions of Paul John Whisky include Paul John Brilliance, Paul John Edited, Paul John Bold, Select Cask Classic and Select Cask Peated. The single malts are now available across 40 countries and have won over 290 prestigious international awards. Special edition releases include Mars Orbiter, Mithuna by Paul John, and Kanya by Paul John. Mithuna by Paul John was declared one of the "Finest Whiskies in the World" by Whisky Bible. Kanya by Paul John was awarded "Asian Whisky of the Year".

Variants

Paul John Single Malt Whisky has 8 single malt variants in production.

- Nirvana – Unpeated Single Malt Whisky – 40% ABV

- Brilliance – Unpeated – 46% ABV

- Edited – With a Hint of Peat – 46% ABV

- Bold – Peated – 46% ABV

- Classic Select Cask – Unpeated – 55.2% ABV

- Peated Select Cask – Peated – 55.5% ABV

- Oloroso Select Cask – 48% ABV

- PX Select Cask – 48% ABV

- Mithuna by Paul John – 58% ABV

Below are the limited-release whiskies from Paul John Single Malt Whisky.

- Kanya – 50% ABV

- Oloroso Single Cask – 57.4% ABV

- Mars Orbiter – 57.8% ABV

- Christmas Edition 2018 – 46% ABV

- Christmas Edition 2019- 46% ABV

- Christmas Edition 2020 – 46% ABV

- Christmas Edition 2021 – 46% ABV

- Port Cask 2022 exclusively for The Whisky Club (Australia) – 52.3% ABV

See also

Amrut

References

Indian whisky
Products introduced in 2012
Alcoholic drink brands